A Hymn of St Columba is a composition for choir and organ by Benjamin Britten, written in 1962. He set a hymn in Latin by Saint Columba, the founder of Iona Abbey, to music. It was published by Boosey & Hawkes.

History 
Britten composed A Hymn of St Columba on 29 December 1962. He wrote the work on a commission to commemorate the 1400th anniversary of a voyage by Columba from Ireland to Iona Island, where he founded Iona Abbey, and from where he was a missionary in the Highlands of Scotland. Britten set a hymn attributed to him, in three stanzas of five lines each. The first line, "Regis regum rectissimi", freely translated to "King of kings and of lords most high", is also the last line of all three stanzas. The text reflects the day of judgement, similar to the Dies irae sequence, first in anxiety, finally in an outlook for rest after earthly desires will have ended.

A Hymn of St Columba is dedicated to Derek Hill who commissioned it. It was published by Boosey & Hawkes. It was premiered outdoors in Churchill, County Donegal, where Columba is said to have preached, but was not easily audible due to the strong wind. The work was recorded several times.

Music 
The music of A Hymn of St Columba follows the tradition of Anglican Church  music, with added personal features. It is suitable as an introit or an anthem in services such as commemorations of Saint Columba, All Souls' Day and Remembrance Day. The duration is given as two-to-three minutes.

The music is scored for a four-part choir and organ. Britten begins, setting the mood of fear for the day of judgement, with an ostinato in the pedal, which recurs throughout the piece, also in the manuals. The voices begin with a unison line, which later reappears at the end as a canon of the high voices and the low voices. In the end, the opening line is sung pianissimo, addressing the "King of Kings" with "hushed awe", as Paul Spicer describes. When Britten conducted the work, he wanted it sung "with fire".

References 

1962 compositions
Choral compositions
Compositions by Benjamin Britten